"Best Friends, For Never" is the second episode of the American superhero television series Peacemaker, a spin-off from the 2021 film The Suicide Squad. The episode was written and directed by series creator James Gunn. It originally aired on HBO Max on January 13, 2022, alongside "A Whole New Whirled" and "Better Goff Dead".

The series is set after the events of The Suicide Squad, and follows Christopher Smith / Peacemaker. Smith returns to his home but is forced to work with A.R.G.U.S. agents on a classified operation only known as "Project Butterfly". Smith also has to deal with his personal demons, including feeling haunted by memories of people he killed for "peace", as well as reconnecting with his estranged father. In the episode, Smith has to deal with the fallout of the events at the building, while Auggie is sent to prison to avoid any incriminating evidence against Smith.

The episode received positive reviews from critics, who praised the writing, directing and character development, although some expressed criticism for the pacing.

Plot
After the attack, Smith goes back to the apartment to retrieves his things, contacting Harcourt to explain the events and asking for help. As the police surround the area, Smith retrieves his suit, also discovering a mysterious device on the apartment. Harcourt and Adebayo arrive at the area to retrieve Eagly.

Detectives Sophie Song and Larry Fitzgibbon enter the building, forcing Smith to hide in an apartment and briefly taking a couple hostage. As the police are about to enter their apartment, Smith jumps through the window to many balconies before a police force corners him. Harcourt arrives and uses a tranquilizer gun to incapacitate the officers, allowing them to escape. Song and Fitzgibbon give chase but they fail to catch them.

Economos then switches Smith's fingerprints at the crime scene with Auggie's , which leads to a police investigation. As the team meets to plan their next move, Murn discovers that Starphausen attacked Smith after she read the dossier that he gave him on the Senator and angrily confronts him. Smith decides to go back to his trailer home, where he is greeted by his previous partner Vigilante. Smith opens up about killing people for his job and Vigilante takes him to the woods for a shooting practice, lifting his spirit. Back at his home, Smith touches the device and finds that it turns into a miniature spaceship.

In order to avoid having Smith connected, Murn has the Adebayo bribe the hostage couple to fully identify Auggie as their attacker, leading to his arrest. At jail, Auggie quickly gains a good reputation among the white inmates, who call him the "White Dragon" while they praise him.

Production

Development
In July 2021, the episode's title was revealed as "Best Friends, For Never".

Writing
According to James Gunn, the reveal of Auggie as the "White Dragon" was met with some mixed reactions by HBO Max executives, deeming it "a delicate situation". Eventually, HBO Max allowed him to go as planned with the storyline. Gunn was interested in exploring the concept of white supremacy, explaining, "I think it's a real thing in our world and being able to present it in a fable is important to us."

The sequence where Adrian Chase helps Peacemaker in lifting his spirit by taking him to a shooting practice was partly inspired by Gunn's childhood. He explained, "We exploded a lot of things. We lit a lot of things on fire. We shot guns. We shot fireworks at each other. We used to start with the bottle rockets and then bring out the bigger bottle rockets. One of us would be on fire and screaming, and then everybody else would be laughing. And then someone would put out the fire and then start laughing, too. And then we'd have to go home to our moms and explain this stuff. So that was purely my superhero representation of what I did as a kid in the woods of Missouri."

Casting
In December 2020, Annie Chang and Lochlyn Munro joined the series to recur as Detectives Sophie Song and Larry Fitzgibbon, with the episode marking their debut in the series.

Critical reception
"Best Friends, For Never" received positive reviews from critics. Samantha Nelson of IGN gave the three-episode premiere a "great" 8 out of 10 rating and wrote in his verdict, "Peacemaker isn't quite as sharply written as Amazon's The Boys, but James Gunn is aiming for the same sort of subversive superhero show, using excessive violence and biting humor to deconstruct the failings of the genre. The three-episode premiere offers a goofy takedown of vigilantism while hinting at bigger and darker plots to come."

Jarrod Jones of The A.V. Club gave the three-episode premiere an "A-" grade and wrote, "Peacemaker is a stacked deck of fearsome insanity and there's a lot to accept in these first three episodes. It's vulgar, violent, prone to non sequitur, and has more than one dance sequence in store for you. But don't you dare let its ceaseless barrage of profanity, nudity, and slaughter dupe you into thinking otherwise: James Gunn's Peacemaker comes packing, among other things, a beating heart."

Alan Sepinwall of Rolling Stone gave the three-episode premiere a 4 star rating out of 5 and wrote, "Between the blood and guts, the slapstick, the political satire, and the musical digressions, there is a lot going on here. Yet the series functions as a sincere character study of its flawed hero — and the unfortunate souls who have to work alongside him — just enough for the joke to never quite wear thin. Even in a wildly oversaturated market for tales of hypermuscular men and women punching their way to justice, Peacemaker stands out. You'll wanna taste it, even the parts that are in incredibly bad taste." Alec Bojalad of Den of Geek gave the three-episode premiere a 4 star rating out of 5 and wrote, "Ultimately, Peacemaker is another win for the suddenly surprisingly competitive DC Comics TV landscape."

References

External links
 

Peacemaker (TV series) episodes
2022 American television episodes
Television episodes directed by James Gunn
Television episodes written by James Gunn